Paulo Roberto de Souza Matos (17 July 1944 – 28 January 2023) was a Brazilian politician. A member of the Brazilian Democratic Movement Party, he served in the Legislative Assembly of Pará from 1983 to 1987 and in the Chamber of Deputies from 1987 to 1991.

De Souza Matos died in Belém on 28 January 2023, at the age of 78.

References

1944 births
2023 deaths
20th-century Brazilian politicians
Members of the Chamber of Deputies (Brazil)
Members of the Legislative Assembly of Pará
Brazilian Democratic Movement politicians
People from Pará